Sergio Aponte Polito is a Mexican Army General who was in charge to combat the drug cartels in Tijuana in 2008.

Aponte Polito became notable for publicly denouncing the hidden relations several high-ranking municipal police officers and government officials had with local drug lords.

References

People of the Mexican Drug War
Year of birth missing (living people)
Living people